Fábio Faria may refer to:

 Fábio Faria (footballer) (born 1989), Portuguese footballer
 Fábio Faria (politician) (born 1977), Brazilian politician